Cory Murphy (born February 13, 1978) is a Canadian former professional ice hockey defenceman. He is currently an assistant coach for HIFK in the Finnish Liiga.

Playing career
Undrafted, Murphy played collegiate hockey with Colgate University. Murphy then played five seasons in SM-liiga, the top professional ice hockey league in Finland; two for Blues, two for Ilves and in 2006–07 for HIFK. In the 2003–04 season with Ilves, he was chosen to the series' all-star team. In the 2006–07 season with HIFK, he was awarded Kultainen kypärä for best player in the league, as well as the Lasse Oksanen trophy for best player of the season during regular season play and Pekka Rautakallio trophy for best defenseman of the season. Murphy was a member of the Canadian team in the 2007 IIHF World Championship that won gold in a 4–2 win against Finland in Moscow.

On March 27, 2007, Murphy signed a two-year National Hockey League contract with the Florida Panthers. Murphy's first NHL goal was scored October 6, 2007 against Kevin Weekes of the New Jersey Devils.

In the 2008–09 season, Murphy played seven games for the Panthers while bothered by a re-occurring shoulder injury. Murphy was sent to the Panthers affiliate, the Rochester Americans, for a two-week conditioning stint before being recalled by the Panthers on January 15, 2009. Murphy was subsequently claimed off re-entry waivers by the Tampa Bay Lightning on January 19, 2009. On July 17, 2009, he was signed by the New Jersey Devils to a two-way contract.

On June 4, 2010, Murphy returned to Switzerland, signing a two-year contract with ZSC Lions of the NLA. At the conclusion of his deal with the Lions, and spending the 2012–13 season in the Kontinental Hockey League with HC Dynamo Minsk on May 21, 2013, Murphy signed a two-year deal with the Swedish team Växjö Lakers of the then named Elitserien.

In his 18th and final professional season in 2017–18, Murphy joined Karlskrona HK of the SHL; he scored 1 goal and 15 points through 51 games, unable to help Karlskrona avoid relegation.

Coaching career
On May 21, 2018, Murphy announced his retirement from playing professional hockey upon accepting an assistant coaching role with Rögle BK of the SHL for the 2018–19 season.

Career statistics

Regular season and playoffs

International

Awards and honours

References

External links

1978 births
Canadian expatriate ice hockey players in Belarus
Canadian expatriate ice hockey players in Finland
Canadian expatriate ice hockey players in Sweden
Canadian expatriate ice hockey players in Switzerland
Canadian expatriate ice hockey players in the United States
Canadian ice hockey defencemen
Colgate Raiders men's ice hockey players
Espoo Blues players
Florida Panthers players
Germany men's national ice hockey team coaches
HC Dinamo Minsk players
HC Fribourg-Gottéron players
HIFK (ice hockey) players
Ice hockey people from Ottawa
Ilves players
Karlskrona HK players
Living people
Lowell Devils players
New Jersey Devils players
Rochester Americans players
Tampa Bay Lightning players
Undrafted National Hockey League players
Växjö Lakers players
ZSC Lions players